Enterolobium barinense, commonly known as  or , is a species of flowering tree in the pea family, Fabaceae. It was previously thought to be endemic to Venezuela, but it has been located in neighboring Colombia as well. It differs from the very similar and sympatric E. cyclocarpum by its black (instead of reddish-brown) and smoother pods, and by its larger, fewer and more rounded leaflets.

References 

Trees of Colombia
Trees of Venezuela
barinense